The Finnish Sailing Federation is the national governing body for the sport of sailing in Finland, recognised by the International Sailing Federation.

Notable sailors
See :Category:Finnish sailors

Olympic sailing
See :Category:Olympic sailors of Finland

Offshore sailing
See :Category:Finnish sailors (sport)

Yacht clubs
See :Category:Yacht clubs in Finland

References

External links
 Official website
 ISAF MNA Microsite

National members of World Sailing
Sailing
1906 establishments in Finland